The American International School of Sydney was an international school located in Epping, Sydney, New South Wales, Australia.

The school operated, in part, under the sponsorship of the United States Ambassador to Australia and awarded the American High School Diploma, which all graduates received upon completion of their studies.

The school closed in 2009 due to low enrolments, and attempted to obtain finance to reopen in 2012.

Alumni students included American film and stage actor Aaron Eckhart, and Sudanese-born professional basketball player Ater Majok.

See also 

 List of non-government schools in New South Wales
List of international schools
American Australians

References

External links
 American International School of Sydney (Archive)

Defunct schools in Sydney
2009 disestablishments in Australia
Educational institutions established in 1999
1999 establishments in Australia
Educational institutions disestablished in 2009
Epping, New South Wales